Abu Jafar ibn Atiyya (died 1158) was a writer and vizier who served four Almohad sultans. He produced a manual for writing official letters which continued to be adopted in both Al-Andalus and the Maghreb during the following centuries. Some of his own letters were preserved by historians of the Almohad Caliphate.

He should not be confused with Abd al-Haqq ibn Attiyya, the theologian from Seville.

Notes

Year of birth unknown
1158 deaths
Moroccan writers
Moroccan letter writers
12th-century Moroccan writers